The Hexagon Theatre is a theatre complex that is part of the University of KwaZulu-Natal, Pietermaritzburg campus.

Notes

References

External links 

 Hexagon Theatre, University of KwaZulu-Natal

Buildings and structures in KwaZulu-Natal
Tourist attractions in KwaZulu-Natal